Miguel Busquéts Terrazas  (15 October 1920 – 24 December 2002) was a Chilean football midfielder who played for the Chile national football team in the 1950 FIFA World Cup.

Career
Busquets began his career with Unión Española in 1939. The next year, he switched to Universidad de Chile, staying with them until 1952, having made two hundred appearances and scored fifteen goals. His last club was Universidad Católica in 1953.

Subsequently to leave Universidad de Chile as a player, he led them as a interim coach.

Record at FIFA Tournaments

References

External links

1920 births
2002 deaths
Chilean people of Catalan descent
Chilean people of Spanish descent
Sportspeople of Spanish descent
Chilean footballers
Chile international footballers
Association football midfielders
Unión Española footballers
Universidad de Chile footballers
Club Deportivo Universidad Católica footballers
Chilean Primera División players
1950 FIFA World Cup players
Chilean football managers
Chilean Primera División managers
Universidad de Chile managers
Place of birth missing
Place of death missing